George Ducas is an American country music singer and songwriter, and musician, known for his pioneering neo-traditional blend of modern-day and roots  country music. He has released four studio albums: 1994's George Ducas, 1997's Where I Stand, 2013's 4340  and 2019's Yellow Rose Motel. His first two albums charted six consecutive singles on the Billboard Hot Country Singles & Tracks (now Hot Country Songs) chart, the highest being his signature hit "Lipstick Promises" which reached No. 9  and was also a No. 1 CMT video. Ducas returned to the No. 1 spot on CMT with his 2019 single "Eastwood."

In addition to his own career, Ducas is an accomplished songwriter having written songs and hit singles for Garth Brooks, The Chicks, Gary Allan, the Randy Rogers Band, George Jones, Eli Young Band, Josh Thompson, and Sara Evans. To date, Ducas’ four studio albums, along with his songwriting credits, comprise a career yielding sales of more than 20 million, two #1 CMT videos, and a Grammy nomination in 2002.

Ducas continues to tour nationally and internationally including Ireland, Brazil, the UK, Sweden, France, and Japan.

Early life
George Ducas was born in Galveston, Texas and was raised in his early years by his father Steve (an Exxon chemical engineer) and his mother Irene (a teacher and a poet) in nearby Texas City, Texas. When he was 5, his parents   divorced and he spent the next five years in California with his mother, who gave him his first guitar. He then moved back to Houston, Texas to live with his father and stepmother to attend middle school and high school. Ducas attended Lamar High School in Houston and afterward attended Vanderbilt University, graduating with a degree in economics. After working six months at an Atlanta bank, he quit and relocated to Nashville to pursue a full-time career in music. "Doing something you love is much more important, even if it's a little more dangerous," Ducas told the Times Leader of Wilkes Barre, PA in 1997.

Musical career
Upon his move to Music City, Ducas performed in Nashville area clubs by night and honed his songwriting skills by day. 1994 saw Ducas score both his first hit as a songwriter as well as his own record deal. As a songwriter, Radney Foster took "Just Call Me Lonesome", a song Ducas co-wrote, into the Top Ten on the country charts. A review of "Just Call Me Lonesome" in Cash Box was positive, stating "Described as a classic shuffle in the tradition of Ray Price or Buck Owens, 'Just Call Me Lonesome' is also reminiscent of Dwight Yoakam's 'Guitars, Cadillacs'. Good Bakersfield sound." Later that year, Ducas signed a record deal with Liberty Records.

1995 - 1996: George Ducas
Ducas' debut single "Teardrops" became a Top 40 hit on the Billboard Hot Country Songs and Country Airplay charts. "Lipstick Promises" followed in early 1995 reaching all the way to #9 leading the way to the release of his eponymous self-titled debut album. George Ducas also produced the No. 52 "Hello Cruel World" and the No. 72 "Kisses Don't Lie".

1997 - 2000: Where I Stand
Due to a restructuring of Liberty Records, Ducas was transferred to Capitol Records Nashville. Prior to his sophomore album's release, Ducas spent time in Bakersfield, CA with one of his songwriting & musical heroes, Buck Owens, where the country music legend took keen interest in Ducas and his music. Buck would continue to reach out and stay in touch even after Ducas returned to Nashville.

Initially Ducas' sophomore album Where I Stand was slated for release in 1996, however some record label shuffling pushed the release into the following year kicking off with the lead single "Every Time She Passes By” followed by “Long Trail Of Tears”. Ducas enlisted Vince Gill to feature his accompanying background vocals on the album. Ducas continued to perform live headlining his own shows and opening for such acts as Alan Jackson, Toby Keith, Mary Chapin Carpenter, Diamond Rio, The Mavericks and Faith Hill. He also made his debut on the Grand Ole Opry.

2000 - 2013: Songwriting Success
While Ducas continued to tour incessantly, he began notching numerous hits as a songwriter for artists such as Garth Brooks, Sara Evans, Eli Young Band, Randy Rogers Band, Gary Allan, The Chicks, Trisha Yearwood and more. One of his songs - "Beer Run (B Double E Double Are You In?)", a Top 30 duet for Garth Brooks and George Jones - earned a Grammy nomination in the process.

In 2005, Ducas and Radney Foster co-wrote the No. 1 hit "A Real Fine Place to Start" for Sara Evans which led to Ducas spending the latter half of 2007 opening shows for her. Other singles that Ducas has co-written include fellow Texas Music artists Randy Rogers Band's 2007 single "Kiss Me in the Dark" and the Eli Young Band's 2008 single "Always the Love Songs," the latter of which he co-wrote with David Lee Murphy. He also co-wrote Josh Thompson's "Won't Be Lonely Long".

2013 - 2017: 4340
In October 2013, Ducas released 4340 through the newly created independent label Loud Ranch. Supporting the album with a tour that centered around Texas and Oklahoma but reached as far as Japan, Ducas experienced major radio airplay in Texas with four singles from the album in “Breakin’ Stuff,” “CowTown,” and the Top 40 Music Row chart hits “LoveStruck” and “All Kinds Of Crazy”. In 2016, Ducas released the single "Party with Your Boots On" which was licensed to the Houston Livestock Show and Rodeo as their first official artist theme song on a limited term usage agreement.

2017 - 2020: Yellow Rose Motel
Following digital releases of select songs throughout 2019, Ducas’ fourth studio album Yellow Rose Motel was released in January 2020. In addition to writing and recording the album in several Nashville recording sessions throughout 2017 and 2018, Ducas also co-produced the album. Yellow Rose Motel was released to resounding critical acclaim including high praise in both the UK and Australia. The song “Eastwood”, the first of three music videos from the album, became Ducas’ second #1 CMT video and remained in the top spot for three weeks. Like much of the entertainment world, the COVID-19 pandemic affected Ducas, which included the cancellation of tours and tabling promotion of Yellow Rose Motel.

2020 - present
In 2020, as a celebration of the 25th anniversary of his biggest hit, Ducas went back into the studio and recorded a new version of "Lipstick Promises." American Songwriter Magazine called the new version 'a fun re-work' as "...the new version now features a little more energy as George kicked the tempo up a couple of notches. It hasn’t changed per se, it just sounds a little more like he plays it when he’s live onstage."
In 2020, Ducas began the process of recording a new album.

Discography

Studio albums

Singles

Music videos

External links
 Official website of George Ducas

References

1971 births
American country singer-songwriters
American male singer-songwriters
American alternative country singers
Living people
People from Texas City, Texas
Singer-songwriters from Texas
Capitol Records artists
Liberty Records artists
Country musicians from Texas